The College of Arts and Sciences of Asia and the Pacific (CASAP) (stylized as "College of Arts & Sciences of Asia & the Pacific") is a private educational institution in the Philippines. It has six separate campuses nationwide.

CASAP is recognized by the Technical Education and Skills Development Authority (TESDA), the Commission on Higher Education (CHED), and the Department of Education (DepEd).

Campuses
 College of Arts & Sciences of Asia & the Pacific – Pasig Campus (Marcos Highway, Santolan, Pasig)
 College of Arts & Sciences of Asia & the Pacific – Taytay Campus (JEM Bldg., Rizal Ave., Taytay, Rizal)
 College of Arts & Sciences of Asia & the Pacific – Bacolod Campus (Rosario-Gatuslao Sts., Bacolod – Main / Brgy. 35, Bacolod – Senior High)
 College of Arts & Sciences of Asia & the Pacific – Rodriguez Campus (Brgy. San Jose, Rodriguez, Rizal)
 College of Arts & Sciences of Asia & the Pacific – Marikina Campus (128 East Drive Cor. Santan St., Brgy. Fortune, Marikina)
 College of Arts & Sciences of Asia & the Pacific – Quezon City Campus (#1 Villongco St., Commonwealth Drive, Quezon City)

Gallery

References

External links
 
  — Official website

Educational institutions established in 2010
Universities and colleges in the Philippines
2010 establishments in the Philippines